Analong (meaning "Ana dragon") is a genus of mamenchisaurid sauropod dinosaur from the Chuanjie Formation in Yunnan, China. The type and only species is Analong chuanjieensis.

Discovery and naming
The holotype, LFGT LCD 9701–1, found in 1995, was in 2011 assigned to the contemporary genus Chuanjiesaurus. However, in 2020, Ren et al. noted several differences between it and the holotype of Chuanjiesaurus, and so assigned it to a new taxon, Analong chuanjieensis. The binomial name means "Ana dragon from Chuanjie," where Ana is the village in Yunnan Province where the holotype was found.

Classification
In a phylogenetic analysis, Analong was found by its describers to be the earliest diverging mamenchisaurid. Their resulting phylogenetic tree of Mamenchisauridae is reproduced below.

References 

Sauropods
Mamenchisaurids
Middle Jurassic dinosaurs of Asia
Fossils of China
Fossil taxa described in 2020